The 1900 All-Western college football team consists of American football players selected to the All-Western teams chosen by various selectors for the 1900 Western Conference football season.

All-Western selections

Ends
 Beyer Aune, Minnesota (CW)
 Neil Snow, Michigan (CW) (CFHOF)

Tackles
 Arthur Hale Curtis, Wisconsin (CW)
 Joe Warner, Iowa (CW)

Guards
 Jerry Riordan, Wisconsin (CW)
 Cyrus E. Dietz, Northwestern (CW)

Centers
 Leroy Albert Page, Jr., Minnesota (CW)

Quarterbacks
 Gil Dobie, Minnesota (CW) (CFHOF)

Halfbacks
 James R. Henry, Chicago (CW)
 Al Larson, Wisconsin (CW)

Fullbacks
 Warren Cummings Knowlton, Minnesota (CW)

Key
CW = Caspar Whitney in Outing magazine

CFHOF = College Football Hall of Fame

See also
1900 College Football All-America Team

References

All-Western team
All-Western college football teams